The 2012–13 season was the 121st season in Liverpool Football Club's existence, and their 51st consecutive year in the top flight of English football.

By virtue of winning the 2011–12 Football League Cup, Liverpool automatically qualified for entry into the 2012–13 UEFA Europa League, thus securing an immediate return to European competition.

Pre-season saw a change of manager for Liverpool, with Kenny Dalglish leaving on 16 May 2012. Brendan Rodgers was unveiled as his replacement on 1 June 2012. Liverpool finished 7th in the Premier League, one place and nine points higher than the 2011–12 season.
According to the Forbes' list of the most valuable football clubs published in April 2013, Liverpool were ranked as the 10th most valuable football club in the world.

First team

Last updated on 19 May 2013. Players' age as of 31 May 2013 (end of season)

Transfers

Transfers in
First team

Reserves and Academy

Loan in
First team

Transfers out
First team

Reserves and Academy

Loans out
First team

Reserves and Academy

Pre-season

Competitions

Overall

Premier League

League table

Results summary

Results by round

Matches

FA Cup

League Cup

UEFA Europa League

Third qualifying round

Play-off round

Group stage

Knockout phase

Round of 32

Statistics

Appearances and goals

Goalscorers
Includes all competitive matches. The list is sorted by shirt number when total goals are equal.
Last updated on 19 May 2013

^^ Players who no longer play for Liverpool's current season

Clean sheets
Includes all competitive matches. The list is sorted by shirt number when total clean sheets are equal.
Last updated on 19 May 2013

Disciplinary record
Includes all competitive matches. The list is sorted by shirt number when total bookings are equal.
Last updated on 19 May 2013

^^ Players who no longer play for Liverpool's current season

Notes

References

Liverpool F.C. seasons
Liverpool
Liverpool